Jason Dunnington (born June 27, 1977) is an American politician who served in the Oklahoma House of Representatives from the 88th district from 2014 to 2020.

References

1977 births
Living people
Politicians from Oklahoma City
Democratic Party members of the Oklahoma House of Representatives
21st-century American politicians